Wardersee is a lake in Kreis Segeberg, Schleswig-Holstein, Germany. At its elevation, its surface area is 3.6 km².

External links 
 

Lakes of Schleswig-Holstein
LWardersee